Access to Information of the Prime Minister's Office (now redefined as "Aspire to Innovate" and the program moved under ICT Division) was a programme of the government's Digital Bangladesh agenda which specializes in introducing citizen-centric public service innovation to simplify public service delivery and improve the lives of citizens by increasing transparency, improving governance and reducing the time, difficulty and costs of obtaining government services.

History 
The programme is part of Vision 2021, a political manifesto of the Bangladesh Awami League party before winning the National Elections of 2008. Anir Chowdhury is the current adviser to the a2i Programme. The Programme aims to provide information to the citizens per "Right to Information Act of 2009" and bring about a change in the Bangladesh Civil Service to a citizen-centric service delivery system.

Notes

External links 
 

Government agencies of Bangladesh
Politics of Bangladesh
Civil service in Bangladesh
Government agencies established in 2007
2007 establishments in Bangladesh